A minor canon  is a member of staff on the establishment of a cathedral or a collegiate church. In at least one foundation the post may be known as "priest-vicar".

Minor canons are clergy and take part in the daily services but are not part of the formal chapter. They are sometimes, but not exclusively, more junior clergy, often chosen for their singing ability, who have already served a curacy, normally in a parish church.

References

Christian priests
Christian religious occupations
Christian terminology
Ecclesiastical titles
Anglican ecclesiastical offices
Catholic priesthood
Catholic ecclesiastical titles